Tucson Mountains is a census-designated place (CDP) in Pima County, Arizona, United States. It is bordered to the east by the city of Tucson and to the west by the Tucson Mountains, including part of Saguaro National Park. It was first listed as a CDP prior to the 2020 census.

Demographics

References 

Census-designated places in Pima County, Arizona
Census-designated places in Arizona